Konstantin Mikautadze (born 1 July 1991 in Sokhumi, Georgia) is a Georgian rugby union player. He plays lock for Georgia on international level. Mikautadze also plays for French club, Toulon in the Top 14 competition.

On 11 July 2010 Mikautadze made his debut for Georgia against Scotland A in the IRB Nations Cup.

He made his debut for Barbarians against Ireland on 28 May 2015.

Career statistics
.

References

External links
itsrugby.co.uk profile

1991 births
Living people
Rugby union players from Georgia (country)
Rugby union locks
RC Toulonnais players
Expatriate rugby union players from Georgia (country)
Expatriate rugby union players in France
Expatriate sportspeople from Georgia (country) in France
Sportspeople from Sukhumi
Georgia international rugby union players